John Abbott is a Canadian politician, who was elected to the Newfoundland and Labrador House of Assembly in the 2021 provincial election. He defeated the leader of the New Democratic Party, Alison Coffin, to represent the electoral district of St. John's East-Quidi Vidi as a member of the Liberal Party of Newfoundland and Labrador. On April 8, 2021, he was appointed Minister of Children, Seniors and Social Development. On May 12, 2021, Supreme Court Justice Donald Burrage rejected Coffin's bid for a recount, arguing that there was not sufficient evidence. Abbott was subsequently sworn-in as MHA on May 18, 2021.

In 2020, Abbott ran for leader of the provincial Liberal party losing to frontrunner Andrew Furey.

Prior to being elected, Abbott served as Executive Director of the Canadian Mental Health Association - NL Chapter. Abbott was also Deputy Minister of Health in the Williams and Ball administrations.

Between 1989 and 1999, Abbott held a number of other senior positions: Assistant Secretary to the Treasury Board, Associate Deputy Minister of Health and Community Services, Chairman and CEO of the Newfoundland and Labrador Housing Corporation, Deputy Minister of Works, Services and Transportation and Deputy Minister of Municipal and Provincial Affairs.

Election results

References

Living people
Liberal Party of Newfoundland and Labrador MHAs
Members of the Executive Council of Newfoundland and Labrador
21st-century Canadian politicians
Year of birth missing (living people)